The Birth of the Milky Way, also sometimes known as The Origin of the Milky Way, is an oil-on-canvas painting by the Flemish artist Peter Paul Rubens, produced between 1636 and 1638 and featuring the Greco-Roman myth of the origin of the Milky Way. The painting depicts Hera (Juno), spilling her breast milk, the infant Heracles (Hercules) and Zeus (Jupiter) in the background, identifiable by his eagle and lightning bolts. Hera's face is modelled on Rubens' wife, Hélène Fourment. The carriage is pulled by peacocks, a bird which the ancient Greeks and Romans considered sacred to both themselves and to Hera/Juno, as a result of their ability to signal changes in weather through cries and hence their perceived connection to the gods. Due to the dark background of the night sky the figures gain a greater sense of volume.

Rubens also painted other Greco-Roman mythological subjects, such as Hercules Fighting the Nemean Lion or Perseus Freeing Andromeda. It is now held at the Museo del Prado, in Madrid.

See also
 The Origin of the Milky Way (Tintoretto)

References

1630s paintings
Paintings by Peter Paul Rubens in the Museo del Prado
Paintings depicting Heracles
Milky Way in fiction
Nude art
Breastfeeding in art
Paintings of Jupiter (mythology)
Paintings of Hera
Birds in art
Mythological paintings by Peter Paul Rubens